Bidessodes is a genus of beetles in the family Dytiscidae. It is found in the Neotropics.

External links
 iNaturalist

Dytiscidae genera